Isaías Pérez Saldaña (28 June 1949 – 27 October 2021) was a Spanish politician. A member of the Spanish Socialist Workers' Party, he served in the Parliament of Andalusia from 1990 to 2008 and was mayor of Ayamonte from 1991 to 1996.

References

1949 births
2021 deaths
Government ministers of Andalusia
Members of the Parliament of Andalusia
Mayors of places in Andalusia
People from the Province of Huelva
Spanish Socialist Workers' Party politicians